Khada dupatta (upright stole) is the traditional wedding dress of Hyderabadi Muslim brides in the Indian subcontinent. It is an elaborate wedding ensemble comprising a kurta (tunic), chooridaar (extra-long slim pants that gather at the ankles), and a 6-yard dupatta (stole or veil).

History
Early in the 17th century, Turkish and Persian craftsmen were invited to India by Mughal Empress Noor Jehan to craft a noble dress, that became particular only for family members of Mughal noble ladies. The art of dupatta crafting remains particular to Mughal descendants. Later, when Mughal governor Nizam-ul-Mulk declared his autonomy over  Hyderabad Deccan Suba, the begums of Nizam's family modified the creative style of Mughals to form Khara Dupatta. Which was later practiced by general residents of Hyderabad. The montage gallery at Chowmahalla Palace exhibits the lifestyle royal dresses of Nizams Begums which includes Kara Dupatta.

The ensemble

Sometimes the kurta is worn with a long, lightweight sleeveless overcoat or a shorter koti, a bolero-like waistcoat. The brides wear a matching ghoonghat (veil) over the head.

The dupatta is usually made of net material and embroidered with zardozi work. The border of the dupatta has masala or a ribbon border with embroidered golden motifs.

The usual accompanying jewellery is:
 Tika/maang tikka/head locket - a medallion of uncut diamonds worn on the forehead and suspended by a string of pearls
 Jhoomar/paasa - a fan-shaped ornament worn on the side of the head
 Nath - a nose ring with a large ruby bead flanked by two pearls
 Chintaak aka Jadaoo lachcha or Guluband - a choker studded with uncut diamonds and precious stones
 Kan phool - earrings that match the Chintaak and consist of a flower motif covering the ear lobe and a bell-shaped ornament that is suspended from the flower. The weight of precious stones and gold in the Karan phool is held up by sahare or supports made of strands of pearls that are fastened into the wearer's hair.
 Satlada - necklace of seven strands of pearls set with emeralds, diamonds and rubies
 Ranihaar - a long strand of pearls with a wide pendant
 Jugni - necklace with several strands of pearls with a central pendant
 Gote - Shellac bangles studded with rhinestones and worn with gold colored glass bangles called sonabai
 Payal - anklets
 Gintiyan - toe rings

Wearing style

The dupatta is draped with the very top part of the middle of the dupatta tucked into the back of the chooridaar. The dupatta is folded accordion pleats at both ends, which are held in place on the left shoulder with a brooch. The free ends of the dupatta are worn under the right shoulder and over the inside of the right elbow.

See also

 Achkan
 Indian wedding clothes
 Ghoonghat
 Indian dress
 Salwar kameez
 Churidar
 Kurta
 Ghagra
 Lehenga
 Dupatta
 Wedding sari

References

External links
On dating the khada dupatta-The Hindu

Biryani, Hyderabad
Folk costumes
History of Asian clothing
Indian clothing
Indian wedding clothing
Islamic culture
Pakistani clothing